The 1906–07 SEGAS Championship was the second championship organized by SEGAS and the Hellenic Olympic Committee.

Overview
The competition was held in a cup-like format. All 3 matches took place at the Neo Phaliron Velodrome. Ethnikos won the championship, after beating Akadimaikon Gimnastirion 2-1 in the final. Note that Akadimaikon Gimnastirion was the Athenian University's football team. The other 3 contestants were the same with the previous season.

Teams
As with last year all teams came from Athens or Piraeus.

Semi-finals

Final

References
Empros Newspaper, 12 February 1907 issue (Page 4, Greek)
Empros Newspaper, 19 February 1907 issue (Page 2, Greek)
Empros Newspaper, 25 February 1907 issue (Page 2, Greek)

 

Panhellenic Championship seasons
Greece
1906–07 in Greek football